Parliamentary elections were held in Austria on 24 April 1983. The result was a victory for the Socialist Party, which won 90 of the 183 seats. However, the Socialists lost the outright majority they had held since 1971, prompting Bruno Kreisky to stand down as SPÖ leader and Chancellor in favour of Fred Sinowatz. The SPÖ stayed in office by entering into a coalition government with the Freedom Party of Austria, which at this point was a liberal party. Voter turnout was 93%.

Results

References

Elections in Austria
Austria
Legislative
Austria